Fairy Gifts (in French : Les Dons) is a French literary fairy tale, by the Comte de Caylus (1692–1765). Andrew Lang included it in his The Green Fairy Book (1892; this is a reworked version).

Synopsis
The Flower Fairy raised princes and princesses in her house and never sent them away grown without a gift. Her favorite was the Princess Sylvia, but she was curious how some other princesses had prospered with their gifts.

One day, she sent Sylvia to visit a former charge, Iris, who had received the gift of beauty. Sylvia returned with news that Iris thought that beauty supplied everything and she need do nothing else; unfortunately, she had fallen ill during the visit, and lost her looks. The fairy regretted that she could give such gifts once.

She sent her to others, but the princess who received eloquence would not be quiet and wearied all her listeners in time; the princess who received the gift of pleasing was insincere and made all her lovers weary of her; the princess who received wit was always turning everything into an occasion for it and took nothing seriously.

Sylvia asked for herself a quiet spirit, which made her and everyone around her happy.

External links
 Fairy Gifts
 Fairy Gifts
 Original French tale on Gallica (BNF)

French fairy tales
Fictional fairies and sprites